Sorting nexin-4 is a protein that in humans is encoded by the SNX4 gene.

This gene encodes a member of the sorting nexin family. Members of this family contain a phox (PX) domain, which is a phosphoinositide binding domain, and are involved in intracellular trafficking. This protein associated with the long isoform of the leptin receptor and with receptor tyrosine kinases for platelet-derived growth factor, insulin, and epidermal growth factor in cell cultures, but its function is unknown. This protein may form oligomeric complexes with family members.

Interactions
SNX4 has been shown to interact with BIN1.

References

Further reading